The Mexico Billie Jean King Cup team represents Mexico in the Billie Jean King Cup tennis competition and are governed by the Federación Mexicana de Tenis.  They currently compete in the Americas Zone Group II.

History 
Mexico competed in its first Fed Cup in 1964.  Their best result was reaching the round of 16 on five occasions.

Current team (2017) 
 Renata Zarazúa
 Marcela Zacarías
 Giuliana Olmos
 Nazari Urbina

Results

Players 
Last Updated: 22 August 2019

See also 
Fed Cup
Mexico Davis Cup team

External links 

Billie Jean King Cup teams
Fed Cup
Fed Cup